Swedish three-foot gauge railways (Swedish: "trefotsbanor") are railways with the gauge , or 3 Swedish feet in the old Swedish measurement system. Railways with this gauge have only existed in Sweden. This was the most common narrow gauge in Sweden.

Sweden once had some fairly extensive narrow-gauge railways, but most are now closed. Some were converted to standard gauge (the latest one was KBJ, Kalmar - Berga Järnväg, between Berga and Kalmar in the 1970s) and some remain as heritage railways.

The only commercial Swedish three foot gauge railway still in use is the suburban railway Roslagsbanan ('the Roslagen Railway') in north-eastern Stockholm. The parts of this railway which is still in use will be in continual use in the foreseeable future, with new trains to be delivered in 2020 and there are even plans for a new line to connect this railway to Arlanda Airport.

A branch line of Roslagsbanan, Långängsbanan, was built in 1911 and ran for some years as an isolated  tramway in anticipation of a planned conversion of the main line to raise its capacity, but those plans came to naught and the branch was rebuilt to narrow gauge in 1934; it is closed since 1966.

The Nordmark-Klarälvens Järnväg (NKlJ) was a  network issued from different lines built from 1873. It was electrified in 1920, with 15 AEG-locomotives. A new class of 5 locomotives (ASEA) went in 1961. The network was dismantled in 1990. Only Karlstad-Skoghall was regauged to standard gauge and transferred to SJ.

The longest remaining Swedish three foot gauge railway is the  heritage line from Åseda to Virserum, Hultsfred and Västervik.  between Hultsfred and Västervik are served by daily tourist trains in the summer, including  of dual gauge track.  Tourist railbuses also run along the southernmost  (Åseda–Virserum), albeit less frequent.  The middle section (Virserum–Hultsfred, is only used by draisines or not at all.

The Vadstena–Fågelsta narrow gauge railway was part of a larger network in Östergötland.

The gauge difference to the internationally much more used  is small, only 9 mm, and some used 900 mm vehicles have been brought to Sweden and given a slight wheel adaptation (reducing the flange by  using turning).

See also

Narrow-gauge railways in Sweden

References

 
Track gauges by name
Rail transport in Sweden